Billroth Hospitals is a hospital chain based in Chennai, Tamil Nadu, India. It was founded by Dr. V. Jeganathan on 30 November 1990. Billroth Hospital has its branches in Shenoy Nagar, R A Puram, and Tiruvallur.

Founder
Dr. V Jeganathan was born on 19 December 1953, apart from being the founder and director of Billroth Hospitals he was a well known Surgical Gastroenterologists, Laser, and Laparoscopic Surgeon. He died on 17 May 2007 due to a heart attack.

Departments 

 Institute of Chest Medicine
 Institute of Cardiology
 Institute of Cardio-Thoracic Surgery
 Institute of Ophthalmology
 Institute of Plastic Surgery
 Institute of Endocrinology
 Institute of Dental Sciences
 Institute of Bariatric & Metabolic Surgery
 Department of Orthopaedics
 Institute of Dermatology
 General Surgery
 General Medicine
 Institute of Podiatric
 Institute of Radiology
 Institute of Paediatric
 Institute of Oncology
 Institute of Obstetrics and Gynaecology
 Institute of Neuro Surgery
 Institute of Nuclear Medicine
 Institute of Neurology
 Institute of IVF
 Institute of Gastroenterology
 Institute of ENT
 Institute of Urology & Nephrology

Home Care 

 Home Care
 Ambulance Services
 Pharmacy Services
 Lab Collection Services
 Physiotherapy Services
 Nursing Services

Facilities
Ambulance & Emergency Services
Critical Care Unit
Diagnostic Services such as Dual Source CT and several Others.
Dialysis
Endoscopy
Pharmacy Services

Achievements
Fast Track Cardiac Surgery. In this 4-day fast track surgery, Day 1 is operation, Day 2 is ICU mobilization, Day 3 is Ward care and Day 4 is the discharge of the patient.
Bloodless Heart Surgery was successfully performed by a team of doctors under the Chief Cardiac surgeon Dr. S Thiagarajamurthy on a patient who underwent an aortic valve replacement procedure and coronary artery bypass surgery who refused a blood transfusion.

See also
 Healthcare in Chennai

References

firstExternal links 

 Official Website

Hospital networks in India
Healthcare in Chennai
Hospitals in Chennai
Hospitals established in 1990
1990 establishments in Tamil Nadu